Lovell Township is a township in Jones County, Iowa.

History
Lovell Township was organized in 1898.

References

Populated places in Jones County, Iowa
Townships in Iowa